Rafael Hernández Ochoa (June 4, 1915 – May 18, 1990) was a Mexican politician and lawyer, Governor of Veracruz, from 1 December 1974 to 30 November 1980.

Biography
He was born in Santa Gertrudis, in municipality of Vega de Alatorre, Veracruz, on June 4, 1915. He completed his primary education at the Escuela Enrique C. Rébsamen and graduated high school and college at the Escuela de Bachilleres in Xalapa city.

From 1938 to 1941 studied law at the Faculty of Law and Political Science of the Universidad Nacional Autónoma de México, obtaining a professional degree in the year 1944 with a thesis entitled  "La Intervención del Estado" (State Intervention).

He was President of the National Livestock Confederation and Head of the Legal Department of the Veracruz state government. From 1958 to 1970 he worked in the Interior Ministry and occupied various positions as Deputy Assistant Secretary, Deputy Director of Administration, Director General of Property Control, Director General of Political and Social Research and Assistant Secretary of the Interior. During the time he was an official of the Secretariat participated in different events on migration and tourism both abroad and inside the country, and served as a member of the National Council of Tourism.

From 1 December 1970 to 1973 he served as the Secretary of Labor of Mexico. On May 4, 1974, he was elected under the Institutional Revolutionary Party to serve as Governor of Veracruz and took office on December 1 of that year, serving until 30 November 1980. During his two terms, Ochoa is credited with restructuring the entire Veracruz state university system and transformed old arts training schools into official departments of  universities. He died on May 18, 1990.

See also 
 1974, Veracruz state election
 Cabinet of Luis Echevería

References

Politicians from Veracruz
Mexican Secretaries of Labor
1915 births
1990 deaths
Governors of Veracruz
20th-century Mexican lawyers